We Love Disney is a compilation series consisting of three albums.

We Love Disney may also refer to:

 We Love Disney (2013 album)
 We Love Disney (2014 album)
 We Love Disney (2015 album)